Pir Beg (also Romanized as Pīr Beg; also known as Pīr Bak, Pīr Dak, and Pīrī Beyk) is a village in Darjazin-e Olya Rural District, Qorveh-e Darjazin District, Razan County, Hamadan Province, Iran. At the 2006 census, its population was 58, in 16 families.

References 

Populated places in Razan County